Stadio Giuseppe Sinigaglia is a multi-use stadium in Como, Italy.  It is currently used mostly for football matches and is the home ground of Como 1907. The stadium holds 13,602 people.

The stadium was completed in 1927 and was built on precise will of Benito Mussolini. It is named after the Italian rower and war hero Giuseppe Sinigaglia, a native of Como.

In 2004 British rock band Deep Purple played a concert there.

References

Giuseppe
Giuseppe Sinigaglia
Como 1907